The fourth season of the sports entertainment reality competition series Australian Ninja Warrior premiered on 26 July 2020 on the Nine Network. The season is hosted by Rebecca Maddern, Ben Fordham, Freddie Flintoff and Shane Crawford.

Production

On 17 October 2019, the series was officially renewed for a fourth season at Nine's upfronts, also confirming Fordham, Maddern and Flintoff were returning. The series was again relocated, with filming taking place at Melbourne Showgrounds in Ascot Vale. Due to the COVID-19 pandemic, production introduced audience lock-out, meaning members of the public could not attend as audience; only family members of contestants were allowed to attend. Co-host Rebecca Maddern, was temporarily placed in self-isolation and replaced by Shane Crawford for two heats, before being cleared and returning to filming. Crawford returned to the season as the sideline commentator for the semis and Grand Final after Freddie Flintoff had to fly back to the UK before coronavirus pandemic measures came into effect.

Format Changes

Power Tower - The Power Tower will see the two furthest fastest Ninjas from each heat and semi-final run go head-to-head side by side on an all new obstacle, climbing five 1.5m high steps, before a 2.35m leap to the first bar, travel 4.5m to the vertical pole, which they will slide down to an unsteady horizontal beam, move across a 3m beam to the next pole and climb 5.5m, then lache 1.75m to the horizontal ladder before leaping onto the platform and race to hit the buzzer. 
 Advantages
Heats - The winner will receive a 10-second time advantage into the semi-finals, meaning 10 seconds will be taken off their final time.
Semi-finals - The winner will receive a second chance advantage into the Grand Final, meaning if they make a mistake during their run, they can re-run the course again.

Rounds

Underline represents the contestant who won the Speed Pass in the qualifying heats as a result of winning the head to head competition on the Power Tower.

 represents the contestant who won the Safety Pass in the semi finals as a result of winning the head to head competition on the Power Tower.

Italics denotes female competitors.

Episode 1

Heat 1

This episode aired on 26 July 2020. Only 6 competitors completed this course, with a large number of athletes bowing out on the Doorknob Drop. Returning athlete Ashlin Herbert received a 10-second advantage for the semi-finals, after beating Daniel Mason on the Power Tower.

Quintuple Steps
Tic Toc to Net
Bridge of Blades
Doorknob Drop
Double Squirrel
Warped Wall

Episode 2

Heat 2

This episode aired on 27 July 2020. Only 2 competitors completed this course, with a large number of athletes bowing out on the Doorknob Drop. Returning athlete Ben Polson received a 10-second advantage for the semi-finals, after beating Olivia Vivian on the Power Tower.

Quintuple Steps
Tic Toc to Net
Bridge of Blades
Doorknob Drop
Flying Shelf Grab
Warped Wall

Episode 3

Heat 3

This episode aired on 28 July 2020.  Only 3 competitors completed this course, with a large number of athletes bowing out on the Bar Hop. Returning athlete Sam Goodall received a 10-second advantage for the semi-finals, after beating Matt Filippi on the Power Tower.

Quintuple Steps
Butterfly Wall to Zipline
Bridge of Blades
Bar Hop
Flying Shelf Grab
Warped Wall

Episode 4

Heat 4

This episode aired on 2 August 2020. 10 competitors completed this course, with a large number of athletes bowing out on the Basket Toss. Returning athlete Charlie Robbins received a 10-second advantage for the semi-finals, after beating Bryson Klein on the Power Tower.

Quintuple Steps
Butterfly Wall to Zipline
Bridge of Blades
Bar Hop
Basket Toss
Warped Wall

Episode 5

Semi-final 1

This episode aired on 3 August 2020. The top 12 competitors all completed the course. Returning athlete Zak Stolz received a second chance advantage for the Grand Final, after beating Jordan Papandrea on the Power Tower.

Snake Run
Rolling Log
Diving Boards
Ring Toss 
Slingshot
Warped Wall
Barrell Roll
Spider Jump
Invisible Ladder

Episode 6

Semi-final 2

This episode aired on 4 August 2020. Five competitors completed this course, with a large number of athletes bowing out on the Slingshot. Returning athlete Charlie Robbins received a second chance advantage for the Grand Final, after beating Matthew Bowles on the Power Tower.  

Snake Run			
Rolling Log		
Diving Boards			
Ring Turn			
Slingshot			
Warped Wall			
Barrel Roll		
Spider Jump			
Invisible Ladder

Episode 7

Grand Final, Stage 1

This episode aired on 9 August 2020.

Competitors had to complete Stage 1 within 3 minutes and 45 seconds to advance to Stage 2. Only 8 of the 24 semi-finalists managed to complete all the obstacles in time. Olivia Vivian became the first woman to advance to Stage 2 of the Grand Final in the history of the Australian competition.

Snake Run
Rolling Log
Balance Bridge
Ring Turn
Flying Shelf Grab
Warped Wall
Ferris Wheel
Spider Jump
Chimney Sweep

Episode 8

Grand Final, Stage 2

This episode aired on 10 August 2020. Contestants had 2 minutes and 15 seconds to finish the six obstacles that were Stage 2.

Rope Jungle
Spin Hopper
Salmon Ladder
Unstable Bridge
Wing Nuts
Cat Grab
Wall Lift

Grand Final, Stage 3

Unlike the first two stages, no time limit was imposed on the Ninjas to complete Stage 3. Completion of this stage resulted in progressing to Stage 4.

Hang Climb
Body Prop
Crazy Cliffhanger
Floating Doors
Flying Bar

Stage 4, Mount Midoriyama
Competitors have to climb up a single rope up 20 metres to the top of Mt. Midoriyama within 30 seconds. For the first time in 4 seasons, 3 people made the top of Mt. Midoriyama. They are allowed to hit the buzzer before fully completing the ascent to the top.

Obstacles by episode

Heats 
Time Limit 1:50

Finals

Viewership

References

Australian Ninja Warrior
2020 Australian television seasons